Diogo Madeira (born 6 September 1970) is a Portuguese former butterfly and medley swimmer. He competed at the 1988, 1992 and 1996 Summer Olympics.

References

External links
 

1970 births
Living people
Portuguese male butterfly swimmers
Portuguese male medley swimmers
Olympic swimmers of Portugal
Swimmers at the 1988 Summer Olympics
Swimmers at the 1992 Summer Olympics
Swimmers at the 1996 Summer Olympics
Swimmers from Lisbon